The 1976 World Short Track Speed Skating Championships were the first ever championships and took place between April 9 and 11, 1976 in Champaign, Illinois. The World Championships are organised by the ISU which also run world cups and championships in speed skating and figure skating.

Results

Men

* First place is awarded 5 points, second is awarded 3 points, third is awarded 2 points, fourth is awarded 1 point in the finals of each individual race to determine the overall world champion. The relays do not count for the overall classification.

Women

* First place is awarded 5 points, second is awarded 3 points, third is awarded 2 points, fourth is awarded 1 point in the finals of each individual race to determine the overall world champion. The relays do not count for the overall classification.

Medal table

References

External links
 Shorttrackonline.info Results

World Short Track Speed Skating Championships
World Championships
World Short Track Speed Skating Championships
World Short Track Speed Skating Championships